CKNL-FM is a Canadian radio station that broadcasts an adult hits format at 101.5 FM in Fort St. John, British Columbia. The station is branded as Bounce 101.5 and is owned by Bell Media.

The station originally began broadcasting June 20, 1962 at 970 AM, and later moved to 560 AM and finally to the FM dial at 101.5 FM in 2003. When the FM flip was approved, the station was to continue the country format of the former 560 CKNL. However, likely in response to the recent licensing of CKFU-FM in the same market at that time, when the station flipped to FM the format was switched to a rock station as 101.5 The Bear.

As part of a mass format reorganization by Bell Media, on May 18, 2021, CKNL flipped to adult hits under the Bounce branding.

Former logo

Rebroadcasters
CKHH-FM 106.1 FM - Hudson's Hope

References

External links
Bounce Radio 101.5

Knl
Knl
Fort St. John, British Columbia
Knl
Radio stations established in 1962
1962 establishments in British Columbia